Caitlin Keogh (born 1982) is an American painter, born in Alaska. Keogh's first solo show was in 2017 at the Bortolami Gallery in New York City. In 2020 Keogh began a painting cycle entitled Waxing Year which was completed in 2021.

Her work is included in the collections of the Whitney Museum of American Art and the Institute of Contemporary Art, Boston.

References

Living people
1982 births
21st-century American women artists
21st-century American artists
People from Alaska